Celestine Beyoncé Knowles-Lawson ( Beyonce; born January 4, 1954) is an American businesswoman, fashion designer, and philanthropist known for establishing the brands House of Deréon and Miss Tina by Tina Knowles. She is the mother of singers Beyoncé and Solange Knowles, and, until 2011, was married to their father Mathew Knowles, the manager of Destiny's Child.

For her contribution to the fashion business, Knowles was honored at the ACE Awards in 2001.

Personal life and family
Celestine Ann Beyonce was born in Galveston, Texas, the last of seven siblings. Her mother, Agnéz Beyincé ( Deréon), was a seamstress. Her father, Lumis Albert Beyincé, was a longshoreman. Due to a clerical error on her birth certificate, she spells her surname (Beyonce) "one letter different" than other members of her family. She is of African-American and Louisiana Creole heritage. Knowles was raised Catholic. Her family's roots are from Boutte, Louisiana. She is a direct descendant of Acadian leader Joseph Broussard and French military officer Jean-Vincent d'Abbadie de Saint-Castin. While in high school, Knowles was a part of a singing group called the Veltones, inspired by The Supremes.

On January 5, 1980, she married Mathew Knowles, a Xerox salesman who would later quit his job to manage Destiny's Child. The pair share two children: Beyoncé (born 1981) and Solange (born 1986). She filed for divorce from Mathew in November 2009, dropped the matter in 2010, then refiled in August 2011. She stated "discord or conflict of personalities" that prevented them from "reasonable expectation of reconciliation" as the reason for the divorce. The divorce was finalized in November 2011.

In the summer of 2013, she started dating actor Richard Lawson. Prior to dating, Knowles had been friends with Lawson for more than 30 years. They initially met through her friendship with his late sister. In a 2018 interview, Lawson stated that he had "always admired her from afar and up close too." The couple were married in Newport Beach, California on April 12, 2015.

Through her marriage with Lawson, Knowles became the stepmother of his daughter, actress Bianca Lawson, and his son, Ricky. She also often refers to Destiny's Child member Kelly Rowland as her daughter, whom she helped raise from the age of 11 when Rowland began living with the Knowles family. In an open letter published by Time magazine in 2015, Knowles stated "I gave birth to two of you, but I have four incredible daughters" referring to Beyoncé, Solange, Kelly, and her niece Angie Beyincé.

Knowles has four grandchildren, including Blue Ivy Carter. In addition to her grandchildren through daughters Beyoncé and Solange, she also considers herself a grandmother to Kelly's two children.

Career 
As a fashion designer, Knowles has been featured in publications such as Vogue, Cosmopolitan, Harper’s Bazaar, L’Official, InSyle, and Sports Illustrated. She has also designed costumes for a number of films including Dreamgirls, Pink Panther, Austin Powers in Goldmember, Obsessed, and Cadillac Records.

She began her career at the age of 19 when she relocated to California to work as a makeup artist for Shiseido Cosmetics. However, she returned home when her parents fell ill. Knowles then worked as a dance choreographer for UAB and later a beautician in Birmingham, Alabama. In 1990, she opened Headliners, a 12-seat hair salon located in Houston, Texas. The salon went on to become one of the most famous hair businesses in Houston. Knowles's rise to prominence came as costume designer for Destiny's Child. In the early days of the group's career, she created outfits that the members wore on-stage and to events "out of necessity" because money was limited. She also styled the girls' hair, and they practiced their routines at her shop.

In 2002, she published a book titled Destiny's Style: Bootylicious Fashion, Beauty and Lifestyle Secrets From Destiny's Child in which she discussed how fashion affected Destiny's Child's success. The book was published by HarperCollins. In 2004, Knowles launched the clothing line House of Deréon alongside Beyoncé, naming it after her mother Agnes Deréon. On November 22, 2010, Knowles appeared with Beyoncé on The View to promote her clothing line called "Miss Tina by Tina Knowles". In 2010, she expanded the line to Walmart after it was previously being sold on the Home Shopping Network. Discussing her style of designing for the line, Knowles revealed she aimed to "hide flaws and create a slimming silhouette", adding, "Everything is created like a foundation garment, even the dresses. The pieces are designed to make the woman look leaner and taller."

In 2013, Knowles appeared in Beyoncé's Life Is But a Dream and was credited as Director of Wardrobe. In 2016, she made a small cameo in Beyoncé: Lemonade, appearing in the visual for the song "All Night," which includes shots of her with husband Richard Lawson on their wedding day. In 2019, she appeared briefly in the background of a few shots in Beyoncé's Homecoming, a concert film about the singer's 2018 Coachella Valley Music and Arts Festival performances.

In July 2020, Knowles made a cameo in Beyoncé's Disney+ film Black Is King, which incorporates music from soundtrack album The Lion King: The Gift. Knowles makes appearances in the visuals for the songs "Mood 4 Eva" and "Brown Skin Girl." Before the film's release, she revealed she had let her daughter borrow art pieces for the project. Thus, she is credited as an art curator on the film. That same month, Knowles appeared on The Today Show to promote her Instagram show, "Talks With Mama Tina", which addresses voter suppression, race relations and other social issues.

On May 23, 2021, Knowles presented Trae tha Truth with the Change Maker Award and introduced Padma Lakshmi at the Billboard Music Awards. On June 16, 2021, Knowles appeared in Facebook's Lift Black Voices Hub, in which she revealed what Juneteenth means to her family. In August 2021, it was announced that Knowles would be producing an upcoming program for Discovery, Inc. and the Oprah Winfrey Network, which aims to show the difficulties Black men face today, while highlighting and celebrating the triumphs and successes of everyday living. The docuseries titled Profiled: The Black Man aired in early 2022.

In November 2021, Knowles and husband Richard Lawson confirmed they will reimagine Black Terror, the classic 1971 play by Richard Wesley, as a film produced in partnership with Yendor Theatre Company (YTC) at Newark Symphony Hall and their own WACO Theater Center.

In December 2021, Knowles announced her show "Talks with Mama Tina" would begin airing on Facebook, and include interviews with celebrities, such as Ciara and Zendaya.
The first episode premiered on December 22, with Beyoncé and her children performing the show's theme song. The song was nominated for Outstanding Original Song at the 49th Daytime Emmy Awards.

In April 2022, Knowles made her acting debut on The Proud Family: Louder and Prouder. That same month, she had a role in the Lifetime thriller movie Wrath: A Seven Deadly Sins Story, starring Michelle Williams,  Antonio Cupo and Romeo Miller.

Philanthropy

Humanitarian aid 
In 2002, Tina Knowles, Beyoncé, and Kelly Rowland opened the Knowles-Rowland Center for Youth, a community center in Downtown Houston.

After witnessing the effects of Hurricane Katrina in 2005, Knowles co-founded the Survivor Foundation along with Mathew Knowles, Beyoncé, Solange, and Rowland, in order to provide transitional housing for hurricane victims and storm evacuees.

In 2010, Knowles and Beyoncé established the Beyoncé Cosmetology Center, which offers a seven-month cosmetology training course at the Phoenix House, a non-profit drug and alcohol rehabilitation organization in Brooklyn.

In 2020, following the COVID-19 pandemic in the United States, Knowles took action with Beyoncé's charity foundation, BeyGood, through the #IDidMyPart campaign. Knowles proposed the initiative, following the high number of deaths as a result of contracting the virus in the African-American community in Houston. Knowles has also spoken to raise awareness on a number of US television and news programs, including CBS News and ABC News.

Politics and civil rights 
Throughout the years, Knowles has supported movements promoting civil rights and opposing gender inequality in the United States, especially with regard to African Americans and the LGBT community. Knowles is a philanthropic supporter 
of political and cultural movements, such as Black Lives Matter, African Pride, Still I Vote, and Mothers of the Movement. Knowles has also spoken out against police brutality and violence against women in the United States.

In 2020, Knowles was a part of the Leadership Conference on Civil and Human Rights movement, which advocates for the passage of the Health and Economic Recovery Omnibus Emergency Solutions Act to ensure health care, economic security, justice system reform, housing and voting access in the U.S., in the wake of the economic crisis following the COVID-19 pandemic. Knowles wrote an open letter to United States Senate leaders Mitch McConnell and Chuck Schumer, urging passage of the bill, with support from her daughters, Viola Davis, Whoopi Goldberg, Octavia Spencer and Jada Pinkett Smith.

Where Art Can Occur (WACO) Theater Center 
In 2017, Knowles and her husband Richard founded the Where Art Can Occur (WACO) Theater Center, a non-profit "dedicated to the empowerment of artists, and people in general" in Los Angeles. Beyoncé, Kelly, and Solange make up the WACO Theater Center's Advisory Board.

Honors 
In 2001, Knowles was a recipient at the ACE Awards, which honors individuals who "help raise awareness of the accessories industry with a positive impact".

In 2020, she was honored with the Inspiring Leadership Award at Essence Festival's Empowerment Experience.

Filmography

As producer

See also 

House of Deréon
List of women company founders

References

Bibliography
 

 

1954 births
Living people
American fashion designers
American businesspeople in retailing
American cosmetics businesspeople
American costume designers
Women costume designers
American fashion businesspeople
American manufacturing businesspeople
American people of Acadian descent
Businesspeople from Texas
Destiny's Child
Louisiana Creole people
American women company founders
American company founders
American women fashion designers